The Jacksonville Classic is a preseason college basketball tournament first held in 2021. The tournament features eight teams in two four-team brackets.

History

Champions

Brackets 
* – Denotes overtime period

2021

Campus Games

Duval Bracket

Jax Bracket

References

External links
 Jacksonville Classic

College basketball competitions
College men's basketball competitions in the United States
2021 establishments in Florida
Recurring sporting events established in 2021
Basketball competitions in Florida
Sports competitions in Jacksonville, Florida
21st century in Jacksonville, Florida